The Seattle Mariners 2004 season was their 28th, and they finished last in the American League West at  Ichiro Suzuki set the major league record for hits in a season on October 1, breaking George Sisler's 84-year-old mark with a pair of early singles.

Offseason
December 15, 2003: Quinton McCracken was traded by the Arizona Diamondbacks to the Mariners for Greg Colbrunn and cash.
December 19, 2003: Scott Spiezio was signed as a free agent.

Regular season
At the All-Star Break, the Mariners had lost nine straight and were at  17 games behind the division-leading Texas Rangers.

On October 1, Ichiro Suzuki set the major league record for hits, breaking George Sisler's 84-year-old mark with a pair of early singles. It was his 258th hit of the season. Later in the game, Suzuki got another hit, giving him 259 this season and a major league-leading .373 average. Fireworks exploded after Suzuki's big hit reached the outfield, creating a haze over Safeco Field, and his teammates mobbed him at first base. The crowd of 45,573 was the ninth sellout this season. After the record breaking hit, Suzuki ran to the first-base seats, bowed respectfully and then shook hands with Sisler's 81-year-old daughter, Frances Sisler Drochelman, and other members of the Hall of Famer's family. Fans in downtown Tokyo watched Suzuki in sports bars and on big-screen monitors. Seattle's hitting coach that season was Paul Molitor. Sisler set the hits record in 1920 with the St. Louis Browns over a 154-game schedule. Suzuki broke it in the Mariners' 160th game. Suzuki's hit came off Ryan Drese, boosting Suzuki to 10-for-20 lifetime against him. Suzuki's sixth-inning infield single came off John Wasdin. After Suzuki's 258th hit, he scored his 100th run of the season when the Mariners batted around in the third, taking a 6–2 lead on six hits. Suzuki's first-inning single was his 919th hit in the majors, breaking the record for most hits over a four-year span. Bill Terry of the New York Giants set the previous record of 918 hits from 1929 to 1932. Suzuki has 921 hits in four seasons.

Opening Day box score

Mariners' lineup

Draft

In the 2004 Major League Baseball draft, the Mariners selected Matt Tuiasosopo in the third round for their first pick overall. Out of the 48 players selected by the Mariners in 2004, 5 have played in Major League Baseball including Tuiasosopo, Rob Johnson, Mark Lowe, Michael Saunders, and James Russell.

Season standings

Record vs. opponents

Transactions
June 9: Quinton McCracken was released.
July 23: John Olerud was released.
August 6: Bill Pulsipher was purchased by the Seattle Mariners from the Long Island Ducks (Atlantic).
September 13: Bill Pulsipher was released.

Roster

Player stats

Batting

Starters by position
Note: Pos = Position; G = Games played; AB = At bats; H = Hits; Avg. = Batting average; HR = Home runs; RBI = Runs batted in

Other batters
Note: G = Games played; AB = At bats; H = Hits; Avg. = Batting average; HR = Home runs; RBI = Runs batted in

Pitching

Starting pitchers
Note: G = Games pitched; IP = Innings pitched; W = Wins; L = Losses; ERA = Earned run average; SO = Strikeouts

Other pitchers
Note: G = Games pitched; IP = Innings pitched; W = Wins; L = Losses; ERA = Earned run average; SO = Strikeouts

Relief pitchers
Note: G = Games pitched; W = Wins; L = Losses; SV = Saves; ERA = Earned run average; SO = Strikeouts

Awards and honors
 Edgar Martínez, Designated Hitter, Roberto Clemente Award

Farm system

Major League Baseball Draft 

The following is a list of 2004 Seattle Mariners draft picks. The Mariners took part in the June regular draft, also known as the Rule 4 draft. The Mariners made 48 selections in the 2004 draft, the first being shortstop Matt Tuiasosopo in the third round. In all, the Mariners selected 18 pitchers, 13 outfielders, 6 catchers, 6 shortstops, 3 first basemen, 1 third baseman, and 1 second baseman.

Draft

Key

Table

References

Game Logs:
1st Half: Seattle Mariners Game Log on ESPN.com
2nd Half: Seattle Mariners Game Log on ESPN.com
Batting Statistics: Seattle Mariners Batting Stats on ESPN.com
Pitching Statistics: Seattle Mariners Pitching Stats on ESPN.com

External links
2004 Seattle Mariners at Baseball Reference
2004 Seattle Mariners team page at www.baseball-almanac.com

Seattle Mariners Season, 2004
Seattle Mariners seasons
2004 in sports in Washington (state)